Frederick Knowles may refer to:
 Frederick John Knowles, Scottish World War I flying ace
 Frederick Knowles (footballer), English footballer 
 Frederic Lawrence Knowles, American poet